Suraj Singh Memorial College is a graduate-level college in Kanke Road. It is a constituent college of Ranchi University in Ranchi, Jharkhand, India.

With the industrialization of Ranchi City, the demand for quality education, especially in the field of higher education, increased in the mid sixties. There were a few colleges and large number of economically backward young boys and girls willing to undertake higher education. In this backdrop, a few people thought of opening a college. They approached a philanthropist of Ranchi city for their help and guidance.

History
In 1972, Suraj Singh Memorial College (SSM College) came into existence. The then Chief Minister of Bihar, Kedar Nath Pandey inaugurated the college and it started functioning in the space provided by a school situated in Bariatu Road, Ranchi. The college which was affiliated to Ranchi University, Ranchi was made a constituent unit in the year 1978. The catchment area of this college is the semi–urban fringes of Ranchi City. It also attracts students from other districts of Jharkhand and other states of the country. The college is imparting education up to degree level in all the three faculties, viz., Arts, science and Commerce. The college also offers Honours level courses in many subjects of Arts Commerce and Science.

NAAC rating
The college is assessment and accredited by the NAAC.

Main faculties
SSM College teaches at Intermediate and Degree level. The students of science have been successful in CBSE Medical examination, engineering examinations and several other competitive examinations conducted or organised by the State or Central Government Organizations.

The teachers have been extending consultancy to the government and non-government organizations in the fields of primary education and higher education.

See also
Education in India
Ranchi University
Ranchi
Literacy in India
List of institutions of higher education in Jharkhand

References

External links
 http://www.ssmcranchi.org/

Colleges affiliated to Ranchi University
Educational institutions established in 1972
Universities and colleges in Ranchi
Universities and colleges in Jharkhand
1972 establishments in Bihar